Apollonius of Athens was a son of the ribald poet Sotades. He wrote a work on the poetry of his father. He lived in the late 3rd century BC.

Notes

3rd-century BC Greek people
Ancient Greek writers
Ancient Greek writers known only from secondary sources